Tella is traditional beer of Ethiopia.

Tella may also refer to:
Tella (Osrhoene), an ancient town of Osrhoene, now in Turkey
Tella, Algeria, a commune in Algeria
Tella, India, a village in India
Tella, Mali, a commune in Mali
Tella, Turkey, a town in Turkey

Nathan Tella, English footballer